Vladimir Mikhailovich Pleshakov (born 2 November 1957) is a retired Russian field hockey goalkeeper. Together with his twin brother Sergei he competed in the 1980, 1988 and 1992 Summer Olympics and won a bronze medal in 1980.

In 1975 Pleshakov started playing for the club Torpedo Syzran, but in 1977 moved to SKA Sverdlovsk, where he was serving with the Soviet Army. He retired in 1994 to become a coach of SKA Sverdlovsk. The team was disbanded in 1998, and Pleshakov became an association football administrator.

References

External links
 

1957 births
Living people
Sportspeople from Samara Oblast
Russian male field hockey players
Olympic field hockey players of the Soviet Union
Soviet male field hockey players
Field hockey players at the 1980 Summer Olympics
Field hockey players at the 1988 Summer Olympics
Field hockey players at the 1992 Summer Olympics
Olympic bronze medalists for the Soviet Union
Olympic medalists in field hockey
Medalists at the 1980 Summer Olympics